The 2007 World Junior Figure Skating Championships were held in Oberstdorf, Germany from February 26 to March 4. The event is open to figure skaters from ISU member nations who have reached the age of 13 by 1 July the previous year, but have not yet turned 19. The upper age limit for men competing in pairs and dance is 21. Skaters compete in four disciplines: men's singles, ladies' singles, pair skating, and ice dancing.

The term "Junior" refers to the age level rather than the skill level. Therefore, some of the skaters competing have competed nationally and internationally at the senior level, but are still age-eligible for World Juniors.

The compulsory dance was the Silver Samba.

Medals table

Results

Men

Ladies
American ladies swept the podium.

Pairs

Ice dancing
Ekaterina Bobrova / Dmitri Soloviev won the ice dancing title. Grethe Grünberg / Kristian Rand's silver medal is the first medal for Estonia at an ISU Championship. Kaitlyn Weaver dislocated her left shoulder in the warm-up before the original dance but was able to compete and won the bronze medal with Andrew Poje. Emily Samuelson / Evan Bates were forced to withdraw after he accidentally stepped on his partner's hand, lacerating a tendon.

Prize money
The total prize money for the 2007 World Junior Figure Skating Championships is US$200,000. Pairs and dance teams split the money. Everything is in US dollars. The breakdown is as follows:

References

External links
 Official site
 ISU site
 Prize Money and World Standing Bonus

World Junior Figure Skating Championships
World Junior Figure Skating Championships
Figure skating
World Junior 2007